The Robertson River is a river in Stewart Island/Rakiura, New Zealand. It rises to the east of the Tin Range and flows into the sea east of Port Pegasus.

See also
List of rivers of New Zealand

References

Rivers of Stewart Island